Lena Solli-Reimann (born 21 September 1969) is a Norwegian hurdler. She was born in Malmö, Sweden.

She was Norwegian champion in 100 metres hurdles in 1992, 1993, 1995 and 1996.
She competed in the 100 metres hurdles at the 1996 Summer Olympics in Atlanta.

References

External links

1969 births
Living people
Sportspeople from Malmö
Norwegian female hurdlers
Athletes (track and field) at the 1996 Summer Olympics
Olympic athletes of Norway